Coprinopsis vermiculifer is a species of coprophilous fungus in the family Psathyrellaceae. It is known to grow on the dung of goats.

See also
List of Coprinopsis species

References

Fungi described in 2001
Fungi of Europe
vermiculifer